Calletaera postvittata is a moth of the family Geometridae first described by Francis Walker in 1861. It is found in the Indian sub-region, Sri Lanka, Taiwan, and Sundaland.

Its ground color is pale brown. Hindwing postmedial is distinctly dark brown and broadening gradually towards the dorsum. The caterpillar has a pale grass-greenish body with broken whitish lines bordered with pinkish-brown bands. Head dirty yellow white in color with pinkish-brown spots. Pupation occurs in a light cocoon made by particles of substrate in a crevice or on the ground.
 Host plants of the caterpillar are Memecylon edule and other Memecylon species.

References

Moths of Asia
Moths described in 1861